Josef Maria Eder (16 March 1855 – 18 October 1944) was an Austrian chemist who specialized in the chemistry of photography, and who wrote a comprehensive early history of the technical development of chemical photography.

Life and work
Eder was born in Krems an der Donau in 1855. He studied chemistry, physics and mathematics at the Vienna University of Technology and at the University of Vienna. In 1876, he received his PhD and in 1879, after his habilitation, became lecturer at the Vienna University of Technology. His research then was focused on the chemistry of photography. After spending some time at the Staatliche Gewerbeschule Vienna, he became lecturer at the Höhere Gewerbeschule Vienna. This change improved his possibilities for doing research. In the following years, Eder developed sensitized gelatin silver process. Orthochromatic photographic plates, in combination with a color filter counter-acting the plates' inhomogeneous sensitivity to light of different wavelengths, yielded black and white images showing all colors of the light in their true brightness. Eder was a professor at the Vienna University of Technology from 1892 to 1925. Eder tried to implement science methods into the development of photographic processes. His another invention was the "mercury oxalate photometer" which was a chemical photometer to measure the intensity of UV radiation. After the effect of X-rays on photographic material was published, Eder did research to improve the sensitivity of  photographic material to X-rays. By 1884, Eder started writing his Extensive Handbook of Photography, which is still available as reprint. He was awarded the Lieben Prize in 1895 and became a member of the Austrian Academy of Sciences in 1930. On March 1, 1888 Eder founded the Institute for Photography and Reproduction Techniques (today the Höhere Graphische Bundes- Lehr- und Versuchsanstalt).

Publications 
Eder published over 650 publications. The History of Photography was published in four editions from 1881 to 1932 , each of which was expanded.
 Eder, J. M. (1893). Das Atelier und Laboratorium des Photographen. (Ausführliches Handbuch der Photographie.) Halle a.S: Verlag von Wilhelm Knapp.
 Eder, J. M., & Valenta, E. (1896). Spectralanalytische Untersuchung des Argons (Spectral Analysis of Argon'). Wien: Kaiserlich-Königlichen Hof- und Staatsdruckerei.
 Eder, J. M., & Valenta, E. (1924). Atlas typischer Spektren.
 Eder, J. M. (1930). Ausführliches Handbuch der Photographie. Halle: Wilheim Knapp.
 ----. (1932). Geschichte der Photographie ('History of Photography'). Halle a. S: Knapp.
 ---- (1971). Quellenschriften zu den frühesten Anfängen der Photographie bis zum XVIII Jahrhundert. ('Sources for the earliest beginnings of photography up to the 18th century') Niederwalluf bei Wiesbaden: Dr. Martin Sändig.

Distinctions
In 1884 he was awarded the Progress Medal of the Photographic Society of Great Britain (known as the Royal Photographic Society (RPS) today).

Lieben Prize, 1895
Wilhelm Exner Medal, 1923

References

 The History of European Photography 1900-1938, FOTOFO., 2011.

See also

 Improvements to Julius Scheiner's system of measuring film speeds in Scheinergrade.

1855 births
1944 deaths
People from Krems an der Donau
Austrian chemists
TU Wien alumni
Academic staff of TU Wien
Historians of photography